Lavia is a former municipality in the region of Satakunta, in Finland. It was merged with the city of Pori on 1 January 2015.

The municipality was unilingually Finnish.

People born in Lavia
Frans Mustasilta (1879 – 1949)
Arvo Riihimäki (1891 – 1972)
Pentti Antila (1926 – 1997)
Jaakko Jonkka (1953 – )

References

External links

 

Populated places established in 1868
Former municipalities of Finland
Lavia, Finland